Boninite is an extrusive rock high in both magnesium and silica, thought to be usually formed in fore-arc environments, typically during the early stages of subduction. The rock is named for its occurrence in the Izu-Bonin arc south of Japan. It is characterized by extreme depletion in incompatible trace elements that are not fluid mobile (e.g., the heavy rare-earth elements plus Nb, Ta, Hf) but variable enrichment in the fluid mobile elements (e.g., Rb, Ba, K). They are found almost exclusively in the fore-arc of primitive island arcs (that is, closer to the ocean trench) and in ophiolite complexes thought to represent former fore-arc settings or at least formed above a subduction zone. 

Boninite is considered to be a primitive andesite derived from melting of metasomatised mantle. 

Similar Archean intrusive rocks, called sanukitoids, have been reported in the rocks of several early cratons. Archean boninite lavas are also reported.

Petrology 
Boninite typically consists of phenocrysts of pyroxenes and olivine in a crystallite-rich glassy matrix.

Geochemistry 
Boninite is defined by
 high magnesium content (MgO = >8%)
 low titanium (TiO2 < 0.5%)
 silica content is 52–63%
 high Mg/(Mg + Fe) (0.55–0.83)
 Mantle-normal compatible elements Ni = 70–450 parts per million, Cr = 200–1800 ppm
 Ba, Sr, LREE enrichments compared to tholeiite
 Characteristic Ti/Zr ratios (23–63) and La/Yb ratios (0.6–4.7)

Genesis 
Most boninite magma is formed by second stage melting in forearcs via hydration of previously depleted mantle within the mantle wedge above a subducted slab, causing further melting of the already depleted peridotite. A forearc environment is ideal for boninite genesis, but other tectonic environments, such as backarcs, might be able to form boninite.  The content of titanium (an incompatible element within melting of peridotite) is extremely low because previous melting events had removed most of the incompatible elements from the residual mantle source. The first stage melting typically forms island arc basalt. The second melting event is partly made possible by hydrous fluids being added to the shallow hot depleted mantle, leading the enrichment in large ion lithophile elements in the boninite.  

Boninite attains its high magnesium and very low titanium content via high degrees of partial melting within the convecting mantle wedge. The high degrees of partial melting are caused by the high water content of the mantle. With the addition of slab-derived volatiles, and incompatible elements derived from the release of low-volume partial melts of the subducted slab, the depleted mantle in the mantle wedge undergoes melting.

Evidence for variable enrichment or depletion of incompatible elements suggests that boninites are derived from refractory peridotite which has been metasomatically enriched in LREE, strontium, barium, and alkalis. Enrichment in Ba, Sr and alkalis may result from a component derived from subducted oceanic crust. This is envisaged as contamination from the underlying subducted slab, either as a sedimentary source or as melts derived from the dehydrating slab.

Boninites can be derived from the peridotite residue of earlier arc tholeiite generation which is metasomatically enriched in LREE before boninite volcanism, or arc tholeiites and boninites can be derived from a variably depleted peridotite source which has been variably metasomatised in LREE. 

Areas of fertile peridotite would yield tholeiites, and refractory areas would yield boninites.

Examples

References

 Anthony J. Crawford and W. E. Cameron, 1985.  Petrology and geochemistry of Cambrian boninites and low-Ti andesites from Heathcote, Victoria Contributions to Mineralogy and Petrology, vol 91 no. 1. Abstract
 Dobson, P.F., Blank, J.G., Maruyama, S., and Liou, J.G. (2006) Petrology and geochemistry of boninite series volcanic rocks, Chichi-jima, Bonin Islands, Japan. International Geology Review 48, 669–701 (LBNL #57671)
 Dobson, P.F., Skogby, H, and Rossman, G.R. (1995) Water in boninite glass and coexisting orthopyroxene: concentration and partitioning. Contrib. Mineral. Petrol. 118,414-419.
 Le Maitre, R. W. and others (Editors), 2002, Igneous Rocks: A Classification and Glossary of Terms: Recommendations of the International Union of Geological Sciences Subcommission on the Systematics of Igneous Rocks, Cambridge University Press, 2nd, 
Blatt, Harvey and Robert Tracy, 1995, Petrology, Second Edition: Igneous, Sedimentary, and Metamorphic, W. H. Freeman, 2nd, p. 176 
 Hickey, Rosemary L.; Frey, Frederick A. (1982) Geochemical characteristics of boninite series volcanics: implications for their source. Geochimica et Cosmochimica Acta, vol. 46, Issue 11, pp. 2099–2115
  Resing, J. A., K.H. Rubin, R. Embley, J. Lupton, E. Baker, R. Dziak, T. Baumberger, M. Lilley, J. Huber, T.M. Shank, D. Butterfield, D. Clague, N. Keller, S. Merle, N.J. Buck, P. Michael, A. Soule, D. Caress, S. Walker, R. Davis, J. Cowen, A-L. Reysenbach, and H. Thomas, (2011): Active Submarine Eruption of Boninite at West Mata Volcano in the Extensional NE Lau Basin, Nature Geosciences, 10.1038/ngeo1275.
Petrology

Volcanic rocks
Intermediate rocks
Igneous petrology